Jupiter Rising is the début album of electronic dance music group Jupiter Rising. It was released on September 26, 2006. The song featured "Go!", one of the band's more notable tracks.

Track listing

 Digital album
 "Go!" (main version) — 3:27
 "Wicked" (main version) — 3:46
 "Liv the Day" (main version) — 3:26
 "Hero" (main version) — 4:40
 "The Bus" (main version) — 3:40
 "Foolish" (main version) — 3:51
 "Frenz" (main version) — 3:56
 "Home" (main version) — 3:41
 "Wish" (main version) — 3:14
 "They Say" (main version) — 3:13
 "Backstage" (main version) — 3:45

Credits
Anabel DeHaven - Make-Up
Quincy McCrary - Keyboards, Vocals (Background)
Alan Steinberger - Piano, Keyboards
Craig Stull - Guitar (Electric), Spanish Guitar
Cameron Stone - String Quartet
Mike Shapiro - Bass, Percussion, Drums
Ron Coro - Creative Director
Robert Hadley - Mastering
Samuel Formicola - String Quartet
Jason Villaroman - Producer, Engineer, Editing
Ethan Willoughby - Mixing
Ludvig Girdland - String Quartet
Eric Victorino - Art Direction, Design
Devin DeHaven - Photography
Scott Elgin - Mixing Assistant
Ian Suddarth - Engineer, Assistant
Caleb Speir - Bass
Marc Tanner - Producer
Bob Glaub - Bass
Marc Greene - Digital Editing

References

2006 debut albums
Jupiter Rising albums